The San Ysidro District AVA is an American Viticultural Area located in Santa Clara County, California. It is part of the larger Santa Clara Valley AVA and is located in the foothills of the Diablo Range.  San Ysidro District is significantly cooler than other parts of Santa Clara Valley.  Cooling breezes can reach the area via the Pajaro River which cuts into the nearby foothills.

References

External links
 TTB AVA Maps

American Viticultural Areas
American Viticultural Areas of the San Francisco Bay Area
Geography of Santa Clara County, California
1990 establishments in California